Miyoshi Plant is an automobile engine manufacturing complex in Miyoshi, Hiroshima, Japan operated by Mazda Motor Corporation.  The complex produces piston engines and opened in May, 1974.  It includes 1.667 million square meters of space. The plant builds Mazda's F and J engines.

See also
 List of Mazda facilities

External links
 Mazda Factory locations Japan

Mazda factories
Motor vehicle assembly plants in Japan
Buildings and structures in Hiroshima Prefecture